Campbell Ewing Millar (12 February 1911 – 17 July 1991) was a Progressive Conservative party member of the House of Commons of Canada. He was born in Vancouver, British Columbia, and became an inspector by career.

He was first elected at the Middlesex East riding in the 1962 general election, then re-elected there in 1963. In the 1965 election, Millar was defeated at Middlesex East by Jim Lind of the Liberal party.

References

External links
 

1911 births
1991 deaths
Members of the House of Commons of Canada from Ontario
Politicians from Vancouver
Progressive Conservative Party of Canada MPs